Uma Ramanan is an Indian playback singer, singing predominantly in Tamil. She is also a Live stage performer who has performed for more than 6,000 concerts spanning 35 years. She hails from Tamil Nadu state of India.

Personal life and background 
While at studies, Uma had gone through her classical music training under Pazhani Vijayalakshmi. She participated in many inter-collegiate competitions and won several rewards and accolades. Later, she met A. V. Ramanan, a Television host, performer and actor, who was on the look out for fresh voices for his stage concerts. From then, Uma and Ramanan became duo stage performers. They are married and have a son who also is a budding musician. She also is a dancer trained under Padma Subrahmanyam.

Career

Playback singing 

During Uma's engagement with Ramanan's stage shows, noted producer — cameraman, Janakiraman offered both of them a duet in his 1976 released Hindi film Play Boy. The same pair got an offer to sing for the Tamil film Shri Krishna Leela in 1977 directed by A. P. Nagarajan and one of the last assignments of composer S. V. Venkatraman. In 1980, she sang for the A. V. Ramanan composed film Neerottam. However, it was "Poongathave Thaal Thirava" song for the film Nizhalgal released in the same year and composed by Ilayaraja that brought her to the front running singers list. It gave her a big career break and she went on to record more than 100 songs with Ilayaraja alone. She has also sung for other music directors namely Vidyasagar, Deva and Mani Sharma.

Professional Rapport with Ilayaraja 

Uma Ramanan along with some of her contemporaries is considered to be one of the rare finds of Ilayaraja in his career. She has recorded some of her career best songs under the music composition of Ilayaraja.

Some of her major hits with Ilayaraja include :
 1980 – "Poongathave Thaal Thirava" (Nizhalgal)
 1980 – "Aasai Raaja Aariroe" (Moodu Pani)
 1981 – "Aanada Raagam" (Panneer Pushpangal)
 1981 – "Manjal Veyyil" (Nandu)
 1981 – "Amudhae Thamizhae" (Kovil Pura)
 1981 – "Vaanamae Mazhai Maegamae" (Madhu Malar)
 1981 – "Daaham Edukira Naeram" (Enakaaga Kaathiru)
 1981 – "Palli Araikkul" (Baala Naagammaa)
 1982 – "Bhoopalam Isaikkum" (Thooral Ninnu Pochchu)
 1983 – "Sevvandhi Pookalil" (Mella Paesungal)
 1983 – "Sevvarrali Thotathilae" (Bhagavathipuram Railway Gate)
 1983 – "Aathaadi Adhisayam" (Manavi Sollae Mandhiram)
 1984 – "Kasthuri Maane" (Pudhumai Penn)
 1984 – "Kaadhil Kaetadhu Oru Paatu" (Anbae Odi Vaa)
 1984 – "Maegham Karukkayilae" (Vaidehi Kaathirunthaal)
 1985 – "Kanmani Nee Vara" (Thendrale Ennai Thodu)
 1985 – "Ponn Maanae" (Oru Kaidhiyin Diary)
 1986 – "Yaar Thoorigai" (Paaru Paaru Pattinam Paaru)
 1990 – "Nee Pathi Naan Pathi Kanne" (Keladi Kanmani)
 1990 – "Aagaya Vennilave" (Arangetra Velai)
 1990 – "Unna Paartha Nerathula" (Mallu Vetti Minor)
 1994 – "Ooradangum Samathile" (Pudhupatti Ponnuthayi)
 1994 – "Sri Ranga Ranganathanin" (Mahanadi)
 1995 – "Nil Nil Nil Badhil Sol" (Pattu Paadava)
 1995 – "Velli Nilave" ("Nandhavana Theru")
 1995 – "Poochudum punnivaname" ("Aanazhagan")

Discography

References

External links 

Tamil playback singers
Indian women playback singers
21st-century Indian singers
Singers from Chennai
Tamil singers
Telugu playback singers
Living people
Women Carnatic singers
Carnatic singers
21st-century Indian women singers
Women musicians from Tamil Nadu
Indian women classical singers
Year of birth missing (living people)